The 2004–05 LSU Tigers basketball team represented Louisiana State University in the Southeastern Conference (SEC) during the 2004–05 NCAA Division I men's basketball season.  The team was coached by John Brady and played their home games at Pete Maravich Assembly Center in Baton Rouge, Louisiana.

Roster

Schedule and results

|-
!colspan=9 style=| Regular season

|-
!colspan=9 style=| SEC Tournament

|-
!colspan=9 style=| NCAA Tournament

Rankings

NBA draft

References

LSU Tigers basketball seasons
Lsu
LSU
LSU
LSU